is a Japanese slalom canoer who competed from the mid-1990s to the mid-2000s. He finished 22nd in the C-1 event at the 1996 Summer Olympics in Atlanta.

External links
Sports-Reference.com profile

1972 births
Canoeists at the 1996 Summer Olympics
Japanese male canoeists
Living people
Olympic canoeists of Japan